Andra is a 1971 science fiction novel, the first novel by English writer Louise Lawrence.

In 1976 it was made into a children's television program by ABC Television.

Plot 
The book was set 2000 years from now, after the world was destroyed by war leaving the earth knocked off its rotation and the ground above to become a desolate frozen wasteland with everyone that survived living below the ground in underground cities.

The main story revolves around Andra, a teenage girl who has a terrible accident and has to have a brain graft operation to survive. However, the only donor available was a young man that lived and died in 1987. After the operation her life is totally changed; she becomes a rebel, fighting against the rigid laws that rule society underground in Sub City One and the totalitarian authority that rules over life and death of any individual.

Television series

References

External links 
 Original novel at AustLit (subscription required)
 Review of book at Publishers Weekly

1971 British novels
British science fiction novels
William Collins, Sons books